The Splendid astrapia (Astrapia splendidissima) is a species of Astrapia of the birds-of-paradise family, Paradisaeidae, and one of the least known and most elusive of its family and genus.

Taxonomy and Subspecies 
The Splendid astrapia has two accepted subspecies: A. s. splendidissima and A. s. helios. A third taxon, A. s. elliottsmithorum, is proposed, though it is not characteristically different from race helios to warrant subspecific separation, and is generally considered synonymous with helios. Within the Astrapia genus, the splendid is more closely related to the Arfak astrapia (Astrapia nigra) than its congeners.

Etymology 
The Splendid astrapia's generic name is Astrapia, which is of the word "Astraipios", meaning lightning flash or glare, referring to the brilliant iridescent plumage of the Astrapias. Its specific name, "splendidissima", means "most splendid", again referring to this particular astrapia's splendid colours. In the past, the splendid astrapia has been placed in its own genus (though very briefly), Calastrapia, which means "beautiful astrapia". Its subspecies helios''' specific name simply means "sun", likely referring to its iridescence.

 Description 

The Splendid astrapia is a medium-sized bird-of-paradise species, and it is the smallest member of the Astrapia genus, with males averaging approximately 39 cm (around 15 in), the slightly smaller females coming in at 37 cm (14.6 in). The males probably have the most iridescent plumage of the Paradisaeidae family. The male's head to mantle is a shiny iridescent light bluish-green to yellow-green, while the chin throat is more of a metallic turquoise to shiny green, depending on lighting. Beneath the throat is a coppery-red gorget that tappers as it moves up the side of the breast, all the way to the eyes. The rest of the underparts are a silky dark-green, except for the lower tail-coverts, which is more of a light brownish colour. The upperparts, like the wings and back, are brown to darkish brown. The relatively long tail is made up of two long, white plumes with black spatulate tips with a violet iridescence, and the feathers beneath those are plain black. The drabber female has a dark brown to blackish head, lighter, dark brownish wings and back, dusky light brown underparts with heavy barring, and a similar tail to the male, but without a spatulate tip and a much more reduced amount of white on the upper tail. Subspecies helios is larger than splendidissima, male has a more blue than yellow-green crown, and larger spatulate tips on the longer two central feathers, and female has darker upperparts. They have dark-coloured eyes, lead-grey legs and bill, and dark grey claws.

 Vocalisation 
Much like most of its family members, splendid astrapias make their own unique, though eccentric, vocalizations. A very distinguishable, insect-like "tik to-keet" note is produced by the birds with varying speed, and the "keet" portion sounding akin to a brief whistle; however they also make frog-like croaks, yelps composed of "wroo-wree woo" notes, and simple "teeks" and "toks".

 Range and Distribution 
The Splendid astrapia, like most other Paradisaeids, is native to mid and upper montane and subalpine tropical forests, forest edges and secondary growth; 1750–3450 m, mainly 2100-2700m. Its distribution is largely confined to the central and western highlands of New Guinea, with the nominate race splendidissima being found from the Weyland Mountains to the Paniai Lakes, and race helios'' native found east of the Paniai Lakes to the Hindenburg Range, and possibly to the Victor Emanuel Range.

Conservation 
Widespread and common species throughout its range, the splendid astrapia is evaluated as Least Concern on the IUCN Red List of Threatened Species. It is listed on Appendix II of CITES.

References

External links
 BirdLife Species Factsheet

Astrapia
Birds of New Guinea
Birds described in 1895
Endemic fauna of New Guinea